The eighth and final season of the American sitcom Brooklyn Nine-Nine premiered on August 12, 2021 consists of ten episodes. NBC renewed the series for an eighth season in November 2019 and announced in February 2021 that it would be the final season.

The series revolves around the lives of a group of police detectives at a fictional precinct of the New York City Police Department. It stars Andy Samberg, Stephanie Beatriz, Terry Crews, Melissa Fumero, Joe Lo Truglio, Dirk Blocker, Joel McKinnon Miller, and Andre Braugher.

Summary
The precinct experiences drastic changes as a result of the COVID-19 pandemic and the George Floyd protests. Rosa quits her job and becomes a private investigator after losing faith in the system, Holt struggles to maintain his relationship with Kevin, and Hitchcock retires and keeps in touch with Scully via FaceTime. Jake and Amy attempt to keep their work lives under control during their first year as parents. In response to the increasing tension between officers and the citizens, Amy plans to implement a major reform program, which puts her in the crosshairs of old-school NYPD Union President Frank O'Sullivan. Jake is suspended for five months after making a wrongful arrest on a case he was let go from.

Holt ultimately repairs his relationship with Kevin and they renew their vows. The squad also successfully stop O'Sullivan from sabotaging the reform program proposal, leading to the commissioner implementing it citywide and appointing Holt and Amy as deputy commissioner and chief of the program, respectively. With Amy's new position making their parenting schedule more difficult, Jake decides to quit his job to be a full-time father while Terry becomes the new Captain of the precinct. The series ends with all of them deciding to continue their Halloween Heists despite their life changes.

Cast

Main
 Andy Samberg as Jake Peralta
 Stephanie Beatriz as Rosa Diaz
 Terry Crews as Terry Jeffords
 Melissa Fumero as Amy Santiago
 Joe Lo Truglio as Charles Boyle
 Dirk Blocker as Michael Hitchcock
 Joel McKinnon Miller as Norm Scully
 Andre Braugher as Raymond Holt

Recurring
 John C. McGinley as Frank O'Sullivan
 Marc Evan Jackson as Kevin Cozner

Guest
 Chelsea Peretti as Gina Linetti
Craig Robinson as Doug Judy
 Nicole Byer as Trudy Judy
 Christopher Gehrman as Sam Boyle
 Gregg Binkley as Lyndon Boyle
 Caleb Alexander Smith as Andrea Boyle
 Hal Alpert as Pappy Boyle
 Nicole Ghastin as Mel Boyle
 Galen Howard as Tommy Boyle
 Frederick Koehler as Becca Boyle
 Paul Witten as Todd 
 Jason Mantzoukas as Adrian Pimento
 Winston Story as Bill Hummertrout
 Kyle Bornheimer as Teddy Ramos
 Tim Meadows as Caleb
 Fred Armisen as Mlepnos
 Dan Goor as Janitor Dan
 Joanna Newsom as Caroline Saint-Jacques Renard

Episodes

Production
The eighth season was confirmed by NBC on November 14, 2019. On February 11, 2021, it was announced that the season would be series' last and would comprise ten episodes. In June 2020, actor Terry Crews said four planned episodes for Season 8 had been aborted following the George Floyd protests, as Floyd's murder prompted the producers to reassess the direction of the season's storyline. On December 31, 2020, it was announced that production had ceased on the series due to a surge in COVID-19 cases in Los Angeles, California, where the series is filmed. Production on the season began in April 2021. Filming concluded in June 2021.

Release
In June 2020, it was announced that the season would premiere in 2020 as a part of NBC's fall schedule. However, NBC later delayed the premiere until mid-season 2020–21. On February 11, 2021, it was announced that the season had been pushed back until the 2021–22 television season. However, on May 14, 2021, it was announced that the season would air during the 2020–21 television season after the 2020 Summer Olympics. On May 20, 2021, it was announced that the season would premiere on August 12, 2021 and would consist of back-to-back episodes on Thursdays at 8 p.m. ET.

Reception

Critical response

Ratings

References

External links
  at NBC
 

2021 American television seasons
Brooklyn Nine-Nine
Television productions suspended due to the COVID-19 pandemic